Lonely is the second extended play by South Korean girl group Spica. It was released on November 21, 2012 by B2M Entertainment. The song of the same name was used as the title track for the album.

Track listing

Charts

Sales

References

2012 EPs
Korean-language EPs
Spica (band) albums